Meaford is a municipality in Grey County, Ontario, Canada. Meaford is located on Nottawasaga Bay, a sub-basin of Georgian Bay and Owen Sound Bay, in the traditional territory of the Saugeen Ojibway Nation in southern Ontario.  The municipality's seal and motto reflect its heritage as a place of apple orchards, but in the 21st century the area has partly switched to weekend homes, seasonal homes, and lakeside tourism.

Communities
In addition to the town of Meaford itself, the municipality also includes the communities of Annan, Balaclava, Bognor, Centreville, Leith, and Woodford.

History

In 1837, when this area was part of the St. Vincent Township, locals asked the government for a piece of land at the mouth of the Bighead River. The first settler was from Ireland, before the townsite was laid out by Charles Rankin in 1845 and called Meaford. By then, a sawmill and gristmill were already operating nearby; the post office there was called St. Vincent. Meaford saw little growth until 1850 but then began booming; it had a library by 1856.

Meaford had previously been named Peggy's Landing and Stephenson's Landing.

The post office was renamed Meaford in 1865, after the birthplace of John Jervis, 1st Earl of St Vincent, for whom the township of St. Vincent is named; by then, the community was booming and had connection by steamship and roads with the railway at Collingwood. The community became a town in 1874.

The Northern Railway of Canada's North Grey Railway arrived in Meaford on December 31, 1872 in its westward push from Collingwood via Thornbury. It was originally planned to extend further west to Owen Sound, but this ambition was never realized due to a number of factors, including rough terrain, financial limitations, and competition from the Toronto, Grey and Bruce Railway, which reached Owen Sound in 1873. The railway was later part of the Grand Trunk Railway and Canadian National Railways (CNR) systems. Thereafter, it became known as the CN Meaford Subdivision. Regular passenger service ended in 1960 and the line was abandoned in 1985.

In 1872, there were six churches. By the early 1880s, Meaford boasted three planing mills, three carriage factories, two tanneries, a sawmill, a shingle mill, a woollen mill, two foundries, two flour mills, a dozen general stores, and a wide range of other stores and tradesmen. The community also had ten hotels. A public school was added in 1868 with 152 students within a year. A high school was opened in 1890.

2001 amalgamation
In 2001, with the amalgamation of various municipalities in Southern Ontario, St. Vincent Township, Sydenham Township and the Town of Meaford, were amalgamated to form one municipality entity. Sydenham Township named in part for Lord Sydenham, governor of Canada from 1839 to 1841. St. Vincent Township was named after the Earl of St. Vincent and Meaford was named after his stately house. A township is an area of land (about 15 miles by 12 miles) that is divided into 100 acre farms (usually). For more than one hundred years the townships of Ontario were municipal entities with an elected council and a reeve. Sometimes a small area of a township was separated and incorporated as a town. The town was then a separate and distinct municipality. This was the case with Meaford in 1874 when it was separated from St. Vincent township. However it ceased to be a town at the time of amalgamation.

A transition team preparing for the new municipality voted in September 2000 to name it Georgian Highlands, with the name Meaford ranking second. Highland Hills, Georgian Shores, Bayview, Trillium, Big Head Valley, Georgian View, Cape Rich, Bay Shore Highlands, Georgian Bay Highlands, North Grey and Queen's Bush were other names considered.

But the council of the new Georgian Highlands municipality voted 4-3 on 5 February 2001 voted to name the amalgamated area Meaford, citing confusion with nearby municipalities such as Georgian Bluffs and Grey Highlands. A by-law to formalize the name change to Meaford for the amalgamated area was subsequently passed on 5 March 2001, also by a 4-3 vote.

Since that time confusion has continued in the use of the name "Meaford". At present the name "Meaford" is commonly used in reference to the urban area formerly known as the Town of Meaford, while the name "Municipality of Meaford" is commonly used in reference to the merged region resulting from amalgamation in 2001.

Demographics 

Local government
The former mayors of Meaford were:
 1998–2000: Doug Grant
 2001–2003: Gerald Shortt (first Mayor since 2001 amalgamation)
 2003–2008: Wally Reif
 2008–2014: Francis Richardson
 2014–2022: Barb Clumpus

Meaford is on the eastern edge of the Bruce—Grey—Owen Sound federal and provincial electoral district.

Transportation
The town of Meaford is located on Ontario Highway 26 between Owen Sound and Collingwood on Highway 26.

A local public transit service makes stops within urban Meaford but not in Sydenham or St Vincent.  Local taxis service the area around the town of Meaford.

Billy Bishop Regional Airport is located in the municipality on Highway 26 between the Town of Meaford and Owen Sound.

Education
Meaford has one public school with the Bluewater District School Board: 
 Georgian Bay Community School (Grades JK - 12)

The closest post-secondary school is the Georgian College regional campus in Owen Sound, Ontario.

Trivia
 Several scenes from the Disney movie One Magic Christmas were filmed in Meaford.

Media
The town is served by two community newspapers, the Meaford Express and the Meaford Independent, the latter originally an online only publication, however as of May 31, 2013 and the former being sold and eventually ceasing publication, is available both online and in print. CKNX-FM, originating from Wingham, Ontario to the south, has a low-power retransmitter on 104.9 FM to serve the municipality. Meaford is otherwise served principally by media from nearby Owen Sound. Rogers cable is available in the Town of Meaford while residents in the former St. Vincent and Sydenham have access only to Satellite TV.

Municipal Symbols 
On April 15, 2016 the Canadian Heraldic Authority granted Meaford its coat of arms, flag and badge.

Coat of Arms

Flag 
Per fess Argent and Azure an escutcheon of the Arms.

Badge 
An apple Gules charged with a schooner Argent.

Notable residents
 Lyman Duff, 8th Chief Justice of the Supreme Court of Canada
 Beautiful Joe, a dog immortalized by the 1894 book of the same name
 Claude Bissell, author and educator
 Keith Bissell: composer, conductor, and music educator (1912–1992).
 James Conmee, former Member of Provincial Parliament
 Fred S. Haines (1879–1960) artist
 Tom Harpur, Author and religious columnist
 Don Knight, former Member of Provincial Parliament
 Brent Laing, curler
 Ron Lipsett, former Member of Provincial Parliament
 Marshall B. Lloyd, inventor of Lloyd Loom, Pres. Lloyd Mfg., Menominee, MI 
 Herb Mitchell, former forward for the Boston Bruins
 John Muir, naturalist, author, "Father of the (U.S.) National Parks", left the US to avoid conscription during the Civil War and lived in a cabin near William Trout's mill, where he was working, in the Bighead Valley near Meaford during 1864-1866.
 Bill Murdoch, Member of Provincial Parliament
 Darren Pang, former goaltender for the Chicago Blackhawks and current NHL analyst
 Glenn Smith, former defenseman for the Toronto St. Patricks
 Tom Thomson,  influential Canadian artist of the early 20th century
 Melville "Sparky" Vail, former defenseman for the New York Rangers
 Terry Wong, Canadian astronaut

See also
List of townships in Ontario

References

External links

Lower-tier municipalities in Ontario
Municipalities in Grey County